Loreta Kullashi (born 20 May 1999) is a Swedish football forward who plays for Swedish club FC Rosengård in the Damallsvenskan and the Sweden national team.

Club career
Kullashi was born in Helsinki, Finland, to Kosovar-Albanian parents. She moved to Sweden from Finland when she was five years old, and she grew up in Halmstad. She started playing organised football with Snöstorp Nyhem FF's youth system and moved to AIK in summer 2011. She made her debut for AIK as a 15-year-old, in a Svenska Cupen quarter-final fixture at Umeå IK on 29 March 2015.

She made six appearances in the 2015 Damallsvenskan for relegated AIK, but was given a more central role the following season. In 2016 she scored 15 goals in 20 Elitettan matches and 20 goals in 23 matches across all competitions. In January 2017 she joined English FA WSL club Manchester City on trial, but ultimately re-signed for AIK in time for the 2017 season. In July 2017 she transferred to Damallsvenskan club Eskilstuna United.

On her debut appearance for Eskilstuna United, Kullashi scored two goals in a 4–0 home win over IF Limhamn Bunkeflo. She was praised by team mate Olivia Schough and her new coach for her dribbling abilities.

International career
Kullashi was the youngest player named to the Sweden squad for the 2016 FIFA U-20 Women's World Cup in Papua New Guinea.

In January 2018, 18-year-old Kullashi enjoyed a "dream" debut for the senior Sweden team, scoring two goals in a 3–0 win over South Africa.

International goals

References

External links

 
 
 
 

1999 births
Living people
Swedish women's footballers
Eskilstuna United DFF players
Damallsvenskan players
Women's association football forwards
AIK Fotboll (women) players
Sweden women's international footballers